is a Japanese television drama series.

Cast
 Itsuji Itao as Suzuki Kurokawa  
 Seiichi Tanabe as Shiraishi 
 Kei Tanaka as Akagi
 Mayu Tsuruta as Shizue Kurokawa

References

Nippon TV dramas
2012 Japanese television series debuts
Japanese drama television series
Television shows based on Japanese novels